Jurovski Dol is a settlement in the Municipality of Sveti Jurij v Slovenskih Goricah in northeastern Slovenia. It is the administrative centre of the municipality. The area is part of the traditional region of Styria. It is now included in the Drava Statistical Region.

The parish church in the settlement, from which the municipality also gets its name, is dedicated to Saint George and belongs to the Roman Catholic Archdiocese of Maribor. It is a Gothic building dating to the early 16th century with Baroque side chapels.

The philanthropist and politician Ivan Kramberger was assassinated in Jurovski Dol in 1992.

References

External links
Jurovski Dol at Geopedia

Populated places in the Municipality of Sveti Jurij v Slovenskih Goricah